Perissolestes is a genus of damselflies in the family Perilestidae. There are about 12 described species in Perissolestes.

Species
These 12 species belong to the genus Perissolestes:

 Perissolestes aculeatus Kennedy, 1941
 Perissolestes castor (Kennedy, 1937)
 Perissolestes cornutus (Selys, 1886)
 Perissolestes flinti De Marmels, 1988
 Perissolestes guianensis (Williamson & Williamson, 1924)
 Perissolestes klugi Kennedy, 1941
 Perissolestes magdalenae (Williamson & Williamson, 1924)
 Perissolestes paprzyckii Kennedy, 1941
 Perissolestes pollux (Kennedy, 1937)
 Perissolestes remotus (Williamson & Williamson, 1924)
 Perissolestes remus Kennedy, 1941
 Perissolestes romulus Kennedy, 1941

References

Further reading

External links

 

Lestoidea
Articles created by Qbugbot